Glentanar Junior Football Club are a Scottish football club based in Woodside, an area of the city of Aberdeen. Members of the Scottish Junior Football Association since 1998, they currently play in the North Second Division. The club are based at Woodside Sports Complex and their colours are yellow and blue. One of the founding members Alexsander frank Jackson (Jay) is still with the club today as acting president.

The team are managed since March 2015 by Graham McBeath.

References

External links
Club website

Football clubs in Scotland
Scottish Junior Football Association clubs
Football clubs in Aberdeen
Association football clubs established in 1978
1978 establishments in Scotland